The Monkees Greatest Hits is the first greatest hits compilation album by the Monkees, issued by Colgems in June 1969.

Background
After an unsuccessful movie, Head, from the previous winter, RCA Records attempted to revive interest in the Monkees which was waning, but to no avail. The band was now down to a trio after the departure of Peter Tork, and The Monkees Greatest Hits climbed to number 89 on the Billboard album charts before disappearing.

It is also the only original Monkees album  not to feature any photographs of the group either on the front or back covers.

Despite the "greatest hits" title, many of the tracks chosen were either favorite songs from the TV show or "deep cuts" from the albums. Absent are "(Theme from) The Monkees" and "For Pete's Sake," the latter of which is the second season's closing theme.

All of the A-sides to the band's first six singles were chosen. The Pisces, Aquarius, Capricorn & Jones Ltd. stereo mix of "Pleasant Valley Sunday" was included instead of the single mono mix.  This first compilation also featured the LP debut, as well as the stereo debut, of "A Little Bit Me, a Little Bit You" without handclaps and with Davy Jones singing "Oh girl, oh girl" during the instrumental section which is not present in the mono single version.

Of the eight remaining tracks, "(I'm Not Your) Steppin' Stone" was a very popular B-side. "Randy Scouse Git" was issued as a single in UK and reached #2 on the UK Singles Chart (as "Alternate Title"). "She" was released in Mexico and "Shades Of Gray" in the Philippines; however, they did not do as well as Mexico's number one, "(Look Out) Here Comes Tomorrow" or Australia's chart topper, "(Theme From) The Monkees," neither of which appear on this  package.

Despite Mike Nesmith still being with the group at the time, no songs with Nesmith's lead vocals appear on the album (the Nesmith-penned "Mary, Mary" does make an appearance). Although Peter Tork had recently departed, he gets a co-vocal with Jones on "Shades of Gray." As was common on the show and the albums, Micky Dolenz has many lead vocals on the album; 8 of the 14 tracks feature Dolenz.

Missing from the album are three B-sides that charted in the Billboard Hot 100: "The Girl I Knew Somewhere", "Words" and "Tapioca Tundra". "Take a Giant Step", the B-side to "Last Train to Clarksville", and "Goin' Down", the B-side to "Daydream Believer", also do not make an appearance. Instead, "I Wanna Be Free," "Cuddly Toy" and "Zor and Zam" were included. "Free" appeared multiple times on the TV series; "Cuddly Toy" may have been included because it was written by Harry Nilsson, whose star was on the rise at the time; and "Zor and Zam" was the final song by the group to appear on the series in the show's final episode.

The album progresses in roughly a reverse-chronological order, with more recent hits "Daydream Believer" and "Pleasant Valley Sunday" at the beginning, and early hits "(I'm Not Your) Steppin' Stone" and "Last Train to Clarksville" closing out the album.

All of the tracks would reappear on Barrel Full of Monkees except for "Zor and Zam".

This was finally reissued on 3 Jan 2012, in 180 Gram vinyl, by Friday Music Cataloged as FRM-115. The reissue is exactly the same as the original.

Track listing

Side 1
 "Daydream Believer" (Stewart)
 "Pleasant Valley Sunday" (Goffin & King)
 "Cuddly Toy" (Nilsson)
 "Shades of Gray" (Mann & Weil)
 "Zor and Zam" (Chadwick & Chadwick)
 "A Little Bit Me, A Little Bit You" (Diamond)
 "She" (Boyce & Hart)

Side 2
 "Randy Scouse Git" (Dolenz)
 "I Wanna Be Free" (Boyce & Hart)
 "I'm a Believer" (Diamond)
 "Valleri" (Boyce & Hart)
 "Mary Mary" (Nesmith)
 "(I'm Not Your) Steppin' Stone" (Boyce & Hart)
 "Last Train to Clarksville" (Boyce & Hart)

Unreleased follow-up compilation
RCA/Colgems assembled another Monkees compilation which was never issued. A recent discovery of a test pressing of this record reveals that the title of this album was to be called Greatest Hits, No. 2. Like its predecessor, it contained 14 songs. Four of these songs were key album tracks; five songs were issued on both singles and albums; the remaining five selections were previously released only as singles and would have made their album debut on this collection, had it actually been released.

Again, the Top 40 hits "Words" and "Tapioca Tundra" were, for some reason, overlooked for this compilation. While no official catalog number was ever assigned, the track listing was in place right from the start. Further documentation reveals that all 14 songs were in true stereo. The track line-up was as follows;

Side 1
"(Theme From) The Monkees"
"Porpoise Song (Theme from Head)"
"Someday Man"
"Good Clean Fun"
"Oh My My"
"What Am I Doing Hangin' 'Round?"
"D.W. Washburn"

Side 2
"For Pete's Sake"
"Listen To The Band"
"It's Nice to Be with You"
"The Girl I Knew Somewhere"
"Tear Drop City"
"Long Title: Do I Have to Do This All Over Again"
"Goin' Down"

References
The Monkees Tale, by Eric Lefcowitz, Last Gasp Press 1985, 1989

The Monkees compilation albums
1969 greatest hits albums
RCA Records compilation albums
Colgems Records compilation albums